Eric Clark (13 March 1916 – 9 November 2008) was an  Australian rules footballer who played with Fitzroy and North Melbourne in the Victorian Football League (VFL).

Notes

External links 
		

1916 births
2008 deaths
Australian rules footballers from Victoria (Australia)
Fitzroy Football Club players
North Melbourne Football Club players
Kew Football Club players